Rod Stephen Willard (born May 1, 1960) is a Canadian retired professional ice hockey left winger who played in one National Hockey League game for the Toronto Maple Leafs during the 1982–83 NHL season, on November 17, 1982 against the New York Rangers. The rest of his career, which lasted from 1980 to 1985, was spent in the minor leagues.

Career statistics

Regular season and playoffs

See also
 List of players who played only one game in the NHL

External links

1960 births
Living people
Canadian expatriate ice hockey players in the United States
Canadian ice hockey left wingers
Cornwall Royals (QMJHL) players
Fort Wayne Komets players
Ice hockey people from Ontario
Kalamazoo Wings (1974–2000) players
New Brunswick Hawks players
St. Catharines Saints players
Sportspeople from Temiskaming Shores
Springfield Indians players
Toronto Maple Leafs players
Tulsa Oilers (1964–1984) players
Undrafted National Hockey League players